Laxa may refer to:
 a family name (and people with that name), e.g.:
 Vladimir Laxa (1870-1945), a Croatian general

Laxa, lax, loose or slack in Latin, may refer to:
 Laxå Municipality, a place in Sweden
 Cutis laxa, a group of rare connective tissue disorders in which the skin becomes inelastic and hangs loosely in folds
 Maricel Laxa (born 1970), a Filipino comedian and actress

See also 
 Laksa
 Laxus
 Laxum